Osseiran is an Arabic surname, in Arabic عسيران). Notable people with the surname include:

Osseiran family, a famous Lebanese family
Adel Osseiran, Lebanese politician and statesman, a former Speaker of the Lebanese Parliament
Ali Osseiran, Lebanese politician, MP and former Lebanese government minister
Sheikh Mohamad Osseiran, Jaafari mufti of Saida and Zahrani districts of South Lebanon, Lebanon

Lebanese families
Political families of Lebanon